All for a Girl is a 1912 American short silent film romantic comedy, directed by Frederick A. Thomson and written by Wallace Reid.

Cast
Dorothy Kelly ....  Claire Taylor
Leah Baird ....  Mrs. Gardner
Kate Price ....  The Cook
Harry T. Morey ....  Newspaper Editor
Earle Foxe ....  Billy Joy, a Reporter (as Mr. Foxe)

External links

American silent short films
1912 films
1912 short films
American black-and-white films
1910s romantic comedy films
American romantic comedy films
Vitagraph Studios short films
1912 comedy films
Films directed by Frederick A. Thomson
1910s American films
Silent romantic comedy films
Silent American comedy films
1910s English-language films